Mukthapuram is a village in Prakasam district, Komarolu Mandal,  Andhra Pradesh, India.

Geography 
It has an average elevation of 253 meters (833 feet).

Mukthapuram is a small village located on the main road from Giddaluru to Komarolu.

Demographics 

 India census, Mukthapuram has a population of 771. Males constitute 51% of the population and females 49%.  Mukthapuram has an average literacy rate of 50%.

Education 
Mukthapuram is served by the following elementary school also has an Anganwadi centre : 
 Elementary School

References 

anganwadi center is also located in mukthapuram village and it is run by a good experience valanary teacher
anganwadi center is also located in mukthapuram village and it is run by a good experience valanary teacher

Villages in Prakasam district